Marc Arcis (1655–1739, Toulouse) was a French sculptor. He trained the painter Antoine Rivalz. He produced busts for a galerie des Illustres in Toulouse between 1674 and 1677. In Paris, he took part in the interior decoration of the église de la Sorbonne and produced works for Versailles. After 1690, he based himself solely in Toulouse, decorating several chapels and the churches of Saint-Sernin and Saint-Étienne there.

1655 births
1739 deaths
17th-century French sculptors
French male sculptors
18th-century French sculptors
18th-century French male artists